The Swiss Football Association is the governing body of football in Switzerland. It organizes the football league, the Swiss Football League and the Switzerland national football team. It is based in Bern.

It was formed in 1895, was a founder member of FIFA in 1904 and joined UEFA during its foundation year, 1954. FIFA is now based in Switzerland at Zürich. Also UEFA is based in the Swiss city of Nyon.

ASF-SFV is the abbreviation of the associations name in three of the national languages of Switzerland. ASF stands for both French (Association Suisse de Football) and Italian (Associazione Svizzera di Football), while SFV is the German (Schweizerischer Fussballverband).- Romansh - It is abbreviated as ASB (Associaziun Svizra da Ballape).

Presidents
Ralph Zloczower (2001–2009)
Peter Gilliéron (2009–2019)
Dominique Blanc (2019–present)

References

External links
 
Switzerland at FIFA site (archived 18 June 2007)
 Switzerland at UEFA site
Swiss Association of Football Players (Association of football players)

1895 establishments in Switzerland
Switzerland
Football in Switzerland
Futsal in Switzerland
Football
Organisations based in Bern
Sports organizations established in 1895
Sport in Bern